Ābnabāt is a kind of Persian hard candy made of sugar boiled with added flavours. There are many different kinds of Abnabat, such as Abnabat Gheichi (آبنبات قیچی).

External links
 Ābnabāt, Persian Wikipedia.

Iranian desserts
Candy